Michael Dennis Bryant  (5 April 192825 April 2002) was a British stage and television actor.

Biography
Bryant attended Battersea Grammar School and, after service in the Merchant Navy and the Army, attended drama school and appeared in many productions on the London stage. He made his film debut in 1955. He had a role as Mathieu in the BBC2 serial The Roads to Freedom, a 1970 adaptation of Jean-Paul Sartre's trilogy of the same name. His guest star appearance as Wing Commander Marsh, who feigns insanity in the 'Tweedledum' episode of the BBC drama series Colditz (1972), is still widely remembered.

Bryant was chosen by Orson Welles to play the lead role in The Deep, Welles's adaptation of the Charles Williams novel Dead Calm. The production frequently ran out of money, and following the death of actor Laurence Harvey in 1973, Welles stopped production and announced the movie – which had been completed except for one special effects shot of a ship exploding – would not be released. (The novel was finally adapted to film in 1989.)

In 1969 Bryant took his love of the stage on a strange trip into the realm of cult films, playing a clever male prostitute who outwits a delusional family of killers in the dark comedy Mumsy, Nanny, Sonny and Girly, an adaptation of a play by Maisie Mosco. Due to poor marketing and a lack of faith in the project by the distributor, the film quickly sank into obscurity.

One of Bryant's most memorable performances was in the classic BBC television play The Stone Tape (1972), in which he plays the leader of a team of scientists who investigate ghost sightings in a brooding Gothic mansion. Equally memorable is his later performance in an adaptation of M. R. James's The Treasure of Abbot Thomas (1974). 

Bryant also had a supporting role as a sadistic psychiatrist in the cult classic black comedy The Ruling Class, with Peter O'Toole and Alastair Sim. He also appeared in Richard Attenborough's Gandhi (1982) as a British diplomat.

Having played Vladimir Lenin in the film Nicholas and Alexandra, Bryant later reprised the role in Robert Bolt's play State of Revolution (1977), having previously co-starred in Bolt's unsuccessful Gentle Jack. State of Revolution was significant for featuring the first role Bryant performed at the National Theatre, where he went on to be a constant presence for a quarter of a century. Described by Michael Billington as a "rock-solid company man", he had earlier performed with the Royal Shakespeare Company from 1964, including the premiere production of Harold Pinter's The Homecoming (1965), in which he played Teddy, the returning academic.

In 1980, Bryant won the London Drama Critics Circle Theatre Award for Best Actor, and his other theatrical performances were equally well-thought-of. He won Laurence Olivier Awards in 1988 and 1990 and was nominated twice more.

Filmography

References

External links
 
 

1928 births
2002 deaths
English male film actors
English male stage actors
20th-century English male actors
People educated at Battersea Grammar School
Male actors from London
Laurence Olivier Award winners
Commanders of the Order of the British Empire